is a former Japanese football player and manager.

Playing career
Koso was born in Saga on March 6, 1959. After graduating from Tenri University, he joined Matsushita Electric (later Gamba Osaka) in 1981. He retired in 1991.

Coaching career
In 1990, when Koso was a player, he became goalkeeper coach at Matsushita Electric. He coached until 1997. In 2000, he signed as manager with his local club Sagan Tosu and became a manager. He managed until 2001.

Managerial statistics

References

External links

1959 births
Living people
Tenri University alumni
Association football people from Saga Prefecture
Japanese footballers
Japan Soccer League players
Gamba Osaka players
Japanese football managers
J2 League managers
Sagan Tosu managers
Association football goalkeepers